Mark Leslie Birtwistle (born 17 October 1962, in Auckland) is a New Zealand-born Samoan former rugby union footballer. He played as lock.

Career
He debuted in the 1991 Rugby World Cup, in the match against Wales at Cardiff, on 6 October 1991. His last international match was against Ireland, at Lansdowne Road on 12 November 1996.

Personal life
He is the nephew of the former rugby union footballer Bill Birtwistle, who was a former three-quarter who played for Waikato and for the All Blacks in the 1967 New Zealand rugby union tour of Britain, France and Canada. Currently, he is coach of the Suburbs Rugby Club from Auckland. He is father of Beaudene Birtwistle, who plays as loose forward for Samoa Under-20 and for Counties Manukau.

References

External links
 
 Mark L. Birtwistle at New Zealand Rugby History

1964 births
Living people
Rugby union players from Auckland
Samoan rugby union players
Rugby union locks
Samoa international rugby union players